Sunday 8PM / Saturday 3AM is a re-release of the Sunday 8PM album from Faithless. The CD contains a bonus CD with remixes.

Track listing

References

Faithless albums
1999 remix albums
Cheeky Records remix albums
Albums produced by Rollo Armstrong

de:Sunday 8PM#Sunday 8PM/Saturday 3AM